Institutional care may refer to:
Foster care
Nursing home care
Care at a retirement home
Care at psychiatric hospitals, including:
Involuntary commitment